The May 2022 Canadian derecho was a high-impact derecho event that affected the Quebec City-Windsor Corridor, Canada's most densely populated region, on May 21, 2022.

Three cities across southern Ontario declared a state of emergency. At least eleven people were killed, mostly by falling trees. Power outages affected an estimated 1.1 million customers, and thousands were still without power a week after the storm. Hydro Ottawa described the damage dealt to its power distribution system as more severe than the 1998 ice storm. The storm was the sixth-costliest event in Canadian history.

According to an estimate published on June 15 by the firm Catastrophe Indices and Quantification (CatIQ), the insured damage would amount to C$875 million, that is, C$720 million in Ontario and C$155 million in Quebec. This ranks the derecho as the sixth-costliest natural disaster in Canada in terms of insurance claims.

Background 

Derechos in southern Canada are not common. Derechos affecting this region typically develop in the U.S. Midwest and affect only a small part of the Quebec City-Windsor Corridor. This was the first event in Canada since 1999. In Southern Ontario, a derecho can be expected about once every year, to about once in every four years depending on the area.

Typically, derechos anywhere in this area form during mid-summer. These derechos usually occur when a hot and muggy air mass covers the Midwest and Ohio Valley, since the stronger derechos in this region tend to develop on the northern boundary between the hot, humid air and cooler, drier air where there is also an elevated mixed layer (EML).

Most derechos in Canada are progressive derechos which skirt the northern edge of a heat wave high pressure area, or hybrid derechos which are similar to progressive derechos, but arise ahead of a cold front. Tornadoes which accompany these types of derechos are usually Quasi-Linear Convective System (QLCS) tornadoes which are embedded in the bow front.

Meteorological history 
A persistent May heat wave in the U.S. expanded sporadically to include southern Ontario and Quebec throughout May, resulting in unseasonably warm temperatures more typical of July. After a brief respite, the heat returned on May 19, 20, and 21. A sharp cold front was expected to bring thunderstorms through the region on Saturday, prior to a precipitous drop in temperature potentially resulting in subsequent frost.

The system first formed south of Chicago. On Saturday morning at 10:37 am EST, thunderstorms with significant wind developed in Macomb and St. Clair counties in Michigan. The wind of these storms snapped some trees, mostly in St. Clair County, but this cluster of thunderstorms had not yet formed a bow echo.

The derecho developed near Sarnia at 9:30 am. The bow front continued to widen and intensify east of London, roughly following a corridor between Highway 401 and Highway 7 in Ontario, and then along the Autoroute 20 in Quebec.

The storm moved east at an average 100 km/h, striking Toronto at 1:00 pm, Ottawa at 3:50 pm, Montreal at 5:30 pm, and Quebec City at 6:30 pm. The weather changed very rapidly as the derecho approached. At Pearson International Airport, in the period between 12:52 pm and 1 pm, gust wind speeds went from 72 km/h to 120 km/h.

It weakened over south-central Quebec, and dissipated in the Atlantic Canada region by early Sunday morning.

Straight line wind speeds 

Most of the weather stations along the derecho's path recorded wind gusts near or above , including the Greater Toronto Area, Ottawa, Trois-Rivières, and Quebec City.

A storm survey from the Northern Tornadoes Project reported a severe downburst in parts of southern Ottawa.

Tornadoes 
An EF2 tornado which was embedded in the leading edge of the derecho struck Uxbridge, Ontario at 1:15 pm. Two EF1 QLCS tornadoes were confirmed in London, Ontario. Another EF2 tornado was detected in the Lake Scugog area .

Prediction

For the first day of the Victoria Day long weekend, atmospheric instability was forecast throughout Michigan's south peninsula, the Ohio Valley, southern Ontario and southern Quebec. Most of southern Ontario south of the 401 was assigned a marginal risk of severe weather. Tornadoes were predicted to be possible in eastern Ontario into southern Quebec in the afternoon.

Environment Canada issued weather statements for Sarnia and Windsor at 9:43 am, which was upgraded for Sarnia to a severe thunderstorm warning at 10:25 am. Severe thunderstorm watches for the London area followed at 10:41 am, upgraded to a severe thunderstorm warning at 11:08.

Severe thunderstorm watches were issued for points eastward of London at 11:19 am. These were later upgraded to severe thunderstorm warnings.

Additionally, after the derecho hit London, Environment Canada issued an emergency alert for regions in Ontario and Quebec along the path of the storm, with alerts going out over cellphones, television, and radio. This was the first time Environment and Climate Change Canada (ECCC) issued an Alert Ready message for a Severe Thunderstorm Warning.

However, older models of phones which do not operate under an LTE wireless or a newer wireless network (5G) did not get the message. Phones set to silent or do-not-disturb buried the message. Phone users outside the geographical area of the alerts do not receive those alerts.

Impact 

The derecho impacted roughly 15.6 million people, representing about 41 percent of Canada's population. Strong winds downed over 1,900 hydro poles, five metal transmission towers, and numerous trees along the path of the derecho. The damage included the downing of over 300 power poles in Ottawa. In Quebec, the Laurentides, Lanaudière, and l’Outaouais were most affected.

Ten people were killed in eastern Ontario by windthrown trees or branches. Another person was killed after their boat sank in the Ottawa River near Gatineau, Quebec. Most of the victims were engaged in recreational activities on the holiday weekend.

Extensive damage was inflicted upon homes and buildings by wind and falling trees, with some homes completely destroyed. The communities of Stittsville, Hunt Club, Navan, and Sarsfield, where a church steeple was toppled and farms were destroyed, were the worst hit in the Ottawa area. The St-Fidèle de Fassett church also lost its steeple. In Rockland, a 30-ton silo was moved a foot and had its roof torn off.

Power outages affected over 1.1 million customers, with 586,000 Hydro One outages in Ontario and 550,000 Hydro-Québec outages. In Ottawa, the airport and water treatment plant lost grid power for more than 24 hours. In a letter to Ottawa mayor Jim Watson, Hydro Ottawa described the damage dealt to its power distribution system as "beyond comprehension" and more severe than the 2018 tornadoes or the 1998 ice storm.

Rail and air transportation were significantly affected. Trains along the Windsor-Ottawa corridor were delayed by hours due to trees on the tracks, with some passengers having to be bussed to their destinations. Flights were delayed at Pearson International Airport, while a small plane at London International Airport was flipped over despite being strapped down. Subway trains in Toronto were stalled after one train ran over a downed tree.

Aftermath 

The storm was the sixth-costliest event in Canadian history.

The municipal governments of Uxbridge and Clarence-Rockland declared local states of emergency on May 21. Peterborough declared a state of emergency on May 25. Ottawa did not declare a state of emergency; mayor Watson stated that the city had enough resources to handle the situation and that declaring a state of emergency would only amount to a symbolic gesture.

Due to the extensive infrastructure damage and large number of fallen trees, at least a quarter of outages in the hardest hit areas continued more than four days. Ottawa Hydro restored power to just over half its customers after one week. Three hundred Ottawa-area customers were still without power at the beginning of June. Some rural and remote Hydro One customers in the Perth, Bancroft, and Tweed areas remained without power for multiple weeks.

Forty percent of Quebec hydro outages continued two days after the storm hit. Five percent of customers lost power for more than a week.

Rogers and Bell reported widespread internet and television service outages in Ottawa and the surrounding area, but did not provide information on when service would return. Outages were also reported across southern Ontario.

Due to the Victoria Day holiday, most schools were able to open normally on Tuesday, although a few remained closed because they were still without power.

The National Capital Commission (NCC) greenbelt lost thousands of trees during the derecho, with every greenbelt sector affected. It was the first time the entire NCC greenbelt was closed. Some trails were still closed as of August 25. Red pine logs resulting from the fallen trees can be salvaged at no cost by the public, requiring only a land access permit.

Provincial election
Advance poll voting for the 2022 Ontario provincial election was disrupted by the power outages and by falling trees, particularly in the London, Kitchener-Waterloo, Brampton, Peterborough, and Ottawa regions. Forty-nine advance polls closed after they lost power or were damaged by falling trees or wires, either temporarily or for the day. Some advance poll locations had to be removed or changed, but all locations retained at least one advance poll per riding. One of the London tornadoes brushed the Stronach Community Recreation Centre, where one of the London—Fanshawe advance polls was based.

Provincial elections in Ontario are computerized, but are designed to be used with paper ballots and contingency ballot boxes, as well as hardcopy backups of the electors list. Many polls lacking power were able to operate with natural light. No votes were lost.

Government assistance
At the federal level, Prime Minister Justin Trudeau offered federal aid to severely affected communities.

Locally, Ottawa and Peterborough opened respite centres, with showers and charging stations. Tweed opened a water filling station at its municipal office. Ottawa and Gatineau also offered emergency food aid.

To assist small business owners who had been severely affected by the derecho, Renfrew County offered relief loans to small businesses at 0% interest, with deferred payments for one year.

Gallery

See also 
 List of North American tornadoes and tornado outbreaks
 May 2022 Midwest derecho - similar derecho nine days earlier in the Midwestern United States
 Heat wave of 1995 derecho series - produced two derechos in Southern Ontario
 Late-May 1998 tornado outbreak and derecho 
 Boundary Waters–Canadian derecho
 Heat wave of 2006 derecho series - produced two derechos in Ontario and Quebec
 Weather of 2022

References

2022 meteorology
2022 disasters in Canada
2022 in Ontario
2022 in Quebec
2022 in Toronto
2020s in Ottawa
2020s in Montreal
2020s in Quebec City
May 2022 events in Canada
Natural disasters in Ontario
Natural disasters in Quebec
Derechos in Canada